Aveyime-Battor is a village in the North Tongu District in the Volta Region of Ghana.

Geography
The Volta River flows close to Aveyime-Battor on its way into the Atlantic Ocean.

Education
Aveyime-Battor is known for the Aveyime Battor Secondary Technical School. The school is a second cycle institution.

See also
North Tongu (Ghana parliament constituency)

References

External links and sources
GhanaDistricts

Populated places in the Volta Region